Martin Pohl may refer to:
 Martin Pohl (writer) (1930-2007), German poet and playwright
 Řezník (rapper) (born 1986), real name of Czech rapper
 Martin Pohl (footballer) (born 1981), German footballer
 Martin Pohl (diplomat) (born 1967), Czech diplomat, ambassador to Australia after Hynek Kmoníček

See also
 Martin Poll (1922–2012), American film and television producer
 Martin Poll (priest) (born 1961), British Church of England priest